Lents is a small lunar impact crater on the far side of the Moon. It is located within the north-northwestern section of the immense skirt of ejecta that surrounds the Mare Orientale impact basin. To the south is the Montes Cordillera mountain ring, and to the north-northeast is the damaged crater Elvey.

This is a bowl-shaped formation with an interior floor that is about half the diameter of the crater. Attached to the northeastern exterior of Lents is the satellite crater Lents C, a feature of roughly the same dimension. Slightly more than a crater diameter to the east of Lents C is Pierazzo, which produced a broad, wispy ray system that extends for more than 100 km in all directions. The ray material from this impact lies across both Lents C and Lents, reaching as far north as Elvey.

On some maps, Lents is called Lenz.

Satellite craters
By convention these features are identified on lunar maps by placing the letter on the side of the crater midpoint that is closest to Lents.

References

 
 
 
 
 
 
 
 
 
 
 
 

Impact craters on the Moon